Familial isolated vitamin E deficiency or Ataxia with vitamin E deficiency (AVED) is a rare autosomal recessive neurodegenerative disease. Symptoms are similar to those of Friedreich ataxia.

Cause
Familial isolated vitamin E deficiency is caused by mutations in the gene for a-tocopherol transfer protein. Symptoms manifest late childhood to early teens.

Diagnosis

Treatment
Treatment includes Vitamin E therapy, where lifelong high-dose oral vitamin E supplementation is prescribed to maintain plasma vitamin E concentrations and monitoring vitamin E levels in blood plasma.

See also
 Vitamin E deficiency
 TTPA

References

External links 
 

Autosomal recessive disorders
Rare diseases
Neurological disorders
Vitamin, coenzyme, and cofactor metabolism disorders